Garfield Avenue/Cherry Avenue is a major north-south street in Los Angeles County, California, US.

The avenue lies between Atlantic Boulevard and Rosemead/Lakewood Boulevard. It begins as Garfield Avenue as a minor street north of Grevelia Street in South Pasadena.  It runs through cities like South Pasadena, Alhambra, Monterey Park, Montebello, Commerce, Bell Gardens, South Gate, on way to Paramount before it changes to Cherry Avenue on entrance to Long Beach, Lakewood, and Signal Hill, ending at Ocean Boulevard.

Garfield Avenue/Cherry Avenue intersects with the following freeways:

Interstate 10, San Bernardino Freeway
State Route 60, Pomona Freeway
Interstate 5, Santa Ana Freeway
Interstate 105, Century Freeway
State Route 91, Artesia Freeway
Interstate 405, San Diego Freeway

Transportation
Montebello Transit line 30, Metro Local line 258, and Long Beach Transit line 21, 22 & 23 run along the avenue.

Landmarks
Garfield Theater (Alhambra, California)
The Hat sign (Valley Boulevard and Garfield Ave.)

Alhambra, California
Montebello, California
Streets in the San Gabriel Valley